The Church of Chonchi or Church of St Charles Borromeo— — is a Catholic church located in Chonchi, on the Chiloé Archipelago, Los Lagos Region, southern Chile.

The Church of Chonchi was declared a National Monument of Chile in 1971 and
is one of the 16 Churches of Chiloé that were declared  UNESCO World Heritage Sites on 30 November 2000.

The patron saint of the Church of Chonchi is Charles Borromeo, whose feast day is celebrated on November 4.

This church belongs to the parish of San Carlos, Chonchi, one of the 24 parishes that form the Diocese of Ancud.

See also
Churches of Chiloé

References 

Wooden churches in Chile
Churches in Chiloé Archipelago
World Heritage Sites in Chile
Colonial architecture in Chile
Roman Catholic churches completed in 1764
Roman Catholic churches completed in 1859
1764 establishments in the Spanish Empire
18th-century Roman Catholic church buildings in Chile
19th-century Roman Catholic church buildings in Chile